Reed Hansen (born April 20, 1990) is a champion wakeskater.

Born in Orlando, Florida, Hansen currently resides in Groveland, Florida.

Hansen is an 11-time World Wakeboard Association (WWA) World Champion, 10-time national champion, 4-time Toe Jam Champion, 4 time Alliance wakeskater of the year, 3 time Battle Falls Champion, 3- time Transworld Wakeboarding Magazine Wakeskater of the Year, 3 Time Trick of the year winner, 3 time masters champion, 2 time wakeskatock Champion, 2 Time WWA Cable World Champion, 2 time National Cable Champion, and 2011 Alliance Wake Rider of the Year.

Hansen is the most dominant wakeskater to ever take to the water, and still seems to be getting better in his veteran years.

References

1990 births
Living people
American wakeboarders
Sportspeople from Orlando, Florida
People from Groveland, Florida